Meta is a genus of long-jawed orb-weavers that was first described by Ludwig Carl Christian Koch in 1835. They are often associated with caves, caverns, and recesses, earning some of them the name "cave orbweavers"

Species
 it contains twenty-six species, found worldwide:
Meta abdomenalis Patel & Reddy, 1993 – India
Meta birmanica Thorell, 1898 – Myanmar
Meta bourneti Simon, 1922 – Europe, Georgia, North Africa
Meta dolloff Levi, 1980 – USA
Meta hamata Wang, Zhou, Irfan, Yang & Peng, 2020 — China
Meta japonica Tanikawa, 1993 – Japan
Meta longlingensis Wang, Zhou, Irfan, Yang & Peng, 2020 — China
Meta manchurica Marusik & Koponen, 1992 – Russia (Far East), Korea
Meta menardi (Latreille, 1804) (type) – Europe, Turkey, Iran
Meta meruensis Tullgren, 1910 – Tanzania
Meta mixta O. Pickard-Cambridge, 1885 – China (Yarkand)
Meta monogrammata Butler, 1876 – Australia (Queensland)
Meta montana Hogg, 1919 – Indonesia (Sumatra)
Meta nebulosa Schenkel, 1936 – China
Meta nigridorsalis Tanikawa, 1994 – China, Japan
Meta obscura Kulczyński, 1899 – Canary Is., Madeira
Meta ovalis (Gertsch, 1933) – USA, Canada
Meta qianshanensis Zhu & Zhu, 1983 – China
Meta serrana Franganillo, 1930 – Cuba
Meta shenae Zhu, Song & Zhang, 2003 – China
Meta simlaensis Tikader, 1982 – India
Meta stridulans Wunderlich, 1987 – Madeira
Meta tangi >Wang, Zhou, Irfan, Yang & Peng, 2020 — China
Meta turbatrix Keyserling, 1887 – Australia (New South Wales)
Meta yani >Wang, Zhou, Irfan, Yang & Peng, 2020 — China
Meta tangi >Wang, Zhou, Irfan, Yang & Peng, 2020 — China

Synonyms
Synonyms include:
Meta americana Marusik & Koponen, 1992 = Meta ovalis (Gertsch, 1933)
Meta milleri Kratochvíl, 1942 = Meta bourneti Simon, 1922

Dubious names

Nomina dubia (dubious names) include:
Meta nigra Franganillo, 1920

See also
 List of Tetragnathidae species

References

External links

Araneomorphae genera
Cosmopolitan spiders
Taxa named by Carl Ludwig Koch
Tetragnathidae